The Rockford IceHogs are a professional ice hockey team based in Rockford, Illinois. They are members of the American Hockey League (AHL), having begun play in the League starting in the 2007–08 season. The team plays their home games at the BMO Harris Bank Center, and they serve as the top minor league affiliate of the National Hockey League (NHL)'s Chicago Blackhawks.

History
The current Rockford IceHogs were founded in 1995 as the Baltimore Bandits and then relocated in 1997 to Cincinnati to become the Cincinnati Mighty Ducks. The Cincinnati Mighty Ducks suspended operations for the 2005–06 season due to the lack of an NHL affiliate after their previous affiliates, the Detroit Red Wings and the Mighty Ducks of Anaheim, signed new agreements with the Grand Rapids Griffins and the Portland Pirates, respectively. The franchise was later renamed the Cincinnati RailRaiders, but failed to reach a goal of 2,000 season tickets to re-enter the AHL for the 2006–07 season. On March 19, 2007, the AHL announced that the team had been purchased and relocated to Rockford to become the present-day Rockford IceHogs.

On April 7, 2021, the Blackhawks formally purchased the IceHogs. The Blackhawks also unveiled a $23 million multi-year project to renovate and modernize the BMO Harris Bank Center, which would keep the IceHogs in Rockford through 2036.

Timeline
The franchise was previously known as
Baltimore Bandits (1995–1997)
Cincinnati Mighty Ducks (1997–2005) (an affiliate of the Mighty Ducks of Anaheim and Detroit Red Wings)

The market was previously served by
Rockford IceHogs (1999–2007) UHL

Season-by-season results

Players

Current roster
Updated March 15, 2023.

|}

Team captains

Jim Fahey, 2007–2008
Tim Brent, 2008–2009
Jake Dowell, 2009–2010
Garnet Exelby, 2010–2011
Brandon Segal and Brian Fahey, 2011–2012
Martin St. Pierre, 2012–2013
Jared Nightingale, 2013–2014
Joakim Nordstrom, 2014–2015
Brandon Mashinter, 2015–2016
Jake Dowell, 2016–2017
Kris Versteeg, 2019
Tyler Sikura, 2019–2020
Garrett Mitchell 2021–present

Notable alumni

Bryan Bickell, 2007–2010, 2016
Dave Bolland, 2007–2008
Brandon Bollig, 2010–2013
Troy Brouwer, 2007–2009
Corey Crawford, 2007–2010
Phillip Danault, 2011–2016
Scott Darling, 2014–2015
Niklas Hjalmarsson, 2007–2009
Carter Hutton, 2011–2013
Marcus Kruger, 2012–2013
Nick Leddy, 2010–2011, 2012–2013
Jeremy Morin, 2010–2014
Antti Niemi, 2008–2009
Brandon Pirri, 2010–2014
Brandon Saad, 2012–2013
Andrew Shaw, 2011–2013
Jack Skille, 2008–2010
Ben Smith, 2009–2013
Trevor van Riemsdyk, 2014–2015
Kris Versteeg, 2007–2008, 2019

Team records

Regular season
Goals: Troy Brouwer: 35 (2007–08)
Assists: Martin St. Pierre: 67 (2007–08)
Points: Martin St. Pierre: 88 (2007–08)
Plus/minus: Stephen Johns: 30 (2014–15)
Penalty minutes: Kyle Hagel: 245 (2010–11)
Goaltending wins: Corey Crawford: 29 (2007–08)
GAA: Scott Darling: 2.20 (2014–15)
SV%: Scott Darling: 0.927 (2014-15)

Playoffs
Goals: Chris DiDomenico : 7 (2017–18)
Assists: Martin St. Pierre: 12 (2007–08)
Points: Chris DiDomenico: 18 (2017–18)
Plus/minus: Jim Fahey: 10 (2007–08)
Penalty minutes: Mike Blunden: 35 (2007–08)
Goaltending wins: Corey Crawford: 7 (2007–08)
GAA: Corey Crawford: 2.19 (2007–08)
SV%: Corey Crawford: 0.924 (2007–08)

References

External links
Official website

 
1
Ice hockey clubs established in 2007
2007 establishments in Illinois
Ice hockey teams in Illinois